William Iseham was an English politician. He was a Member of Parliament for Truro in 1554. This was under the reign of Queen Mary when parliament met at Oxford.

In around 1551–1553, Iseham and his wife Margery were defendants in a case brought by Michael Rosewaren of Camborne in Chancery/Star Chamber for enclosure of common in Trevaswythen.

References

Members of the Parliament of England for Truro
Year of birth missing
Year of death missing
Place of birth missing
English MPs 1554